Arthur Bauer (29 November 1916 – 11 December 1990) was a South African cricketer. He played in four first-class matches for Border from 1939/40 to 1946/47.

See also
 List of Border representative cricketers

References

External links
 

1916 births
1990 deaths
Border cricketers
Cricketers from East London, Eastern Cape
South African cricketers